Josh Gratton (born September 9, 1982) is a Canadian former professional ice hockey left winger who last played for the South Carolina Stingrays of the ECHL. Gratton played in the National Hockey League for the Philadelphia Flyers and the Phoenix Coyotes. His cousin is former NHL forward Chris Gratton.

Playing career
Undrafted, Gratton was first signed to a NHL contract with the Philadelphia Flyers on July 27, 2004.

On March 9, 2006, Gratton was traded along with two second round draft picks to the Phoenix Coyotes for Denis Gauthier. He scored his first NHL goal as a Coyote on April 11, 2006, against the Colorado Avalanche.

On February 28, 2008, Gratton was traded along with Fredrik Sjöström and David LeNeveu from the Phoenix Coyotes to the New York Rangers for Marcel Hossa and Al Montoya. Gratton was then assigned to the Rangers' American Hockey League (AHL) affiliate, the Hartford Wolf Pack.

On July 9, 2008, the Nashville Predators signed Gratton to a one-year, two-way contract. After starting the 2008–09 season with the Predators' affiliate, Milwaukee Admirals, Gratton returned to Philadelphia when he was traded in exchange for Tim Ramholt on October 30, 2008.

On July 30, 2009, Gratton signed a one-year contract with the Atlanta Thrashers. During the 2009-10 season, on January 8, 2010, Gratton was reassigned by Atlanta to Vityaz Chekhov of the KHL. For his participation in a mass brawl against Avangard Omsk on December 10, 2010, he was suspended for 15 games.

On October 1, 2014, Gratton returned to compete in North America for the first time in four years, in accepting a try-out contract with the Manchester Monarchs of the AHL to begin the 2014–15 season. Gratton secured a one-year contract with the Monarchs and 46 games added 13 points and a physical edge from the fourth line. Gratton appeared in seven post-season games in helping the Monarch capture their first Calder Cup in their final AHL season.

On August 17, 2015, Gratton returned abroad, agreeing to an initial try-out contract with Finnish club, Ässät Pori of the Liiga.

In July 2018 he signed with the Glasgow Clan of the Elite Ice Hockey League in the United Kingdom. In December 2018, Gratton was released by the Clan and he signed with the South Carolina Stingrays of the ECHL.

Career statistics

Awards and honours

References

External links 
 
JoshGratton.com

1982 births
Barys Nur-Sultan players
Canadian ice hockey left wingers
Chicago Wolves players
Cincinnati Mighty Ducks players
Glasgow Clan players
Hartford Wolf Pack players
HC Vityaz players
Ice hockey people from Ontario
Kingston Frontenacs players
Living people
Manchester Monarchs (AHL) players
Milwaukee Admirals players
Philadelphia Flyers players
Philadelphia Phantoms players
Phoenix Coyotes players
Rødovre Mighty Bulls players
San Antonio Rampage players
San Diego Gulls (ECHL) players
Saryarka Karagandy players
Sportspeople from Brantford
Sudbury Wolves players
Trenton Titans players
Undrafted National Hockey League players
Windsor Spitfires players
Canadian expatriate ice hockey players in the United States
Canadian expatriate ice hockey players in Scotland
Canadian expatriate ice hockey players in Denmark
Canadian expatriate ice hockey players in Russia
Canadian expatriate ice hockey players in Kazakhstan
Canadian expatriate ice hockey players in the Czech Republic
Canadian expatriate ice hockey players in France
Canadian expatriate ice hockey players in Slovakia
Canadian expatriate ice hockey players in Finland